#10 is the eleventh studio album by the Canadian rock band The Guess Who. It was first released in 1973. The title comes from the fact that it was the band's tenth release for RCA Records. This number series includes both a live album and best-of compilation, but not the band's early recordings (prior to 1969) which were not recorded for RCA.

Release history

In addition to the usual 2 channel stereo version the album was also released by RCA in a 4 channel quadraphonic version on both LP and 8-track tape. The quad LP version was released using the Quadradisc system.

The 2012 reissue by Iconoclassic marked the first time the album was made available on CD in the United States. It has upgraded sound quality compared to previous CD releases, and a previously unreleased, stripped-down mix of "Glamour Boy" without the sound effects and crowd noise.

In 2018 the album was reissued again in the UK by Dutton Vocalion on the Super Audio CD format. This disc is a 2 albums on 1 disc compilation which also contains the 1974 album Road Food. The Dutton Vocalion release contains the complete stereo and quad versions of both albums.

Track listing
All songs written by Burton Cummings except noted.
Side one
"Take It Off My Shoulders" (McDougall, Cummings) - 4:03
"Musicione" (The Guess Who) - 3:55
"Miss Frizzy" (Bachman, Cummings) - 4:25
"Glamour Boy" - 5:27
Side two
"Self Pity" - 4:22
"Lie Down" - 4:43
"Cardboard Empire" (Wallace, Winter) - 3:25
"Just Let Me Sing" - 6:13

2012 Iconoclassic Remaster Bonus Track
"Glamour Boy" (Remix - sans string arrangement & sound effects) - 4:49

Personnel
The Guess Who
Burton Cummings – lead vocals, keyboards
Kurt Winter – lead guitar
Donnie McDougall - rhythm guitar, backing vocals
Bill Wallace – bass, backing vocals
Garry Peterson – drums
Additional personnel
Ron Halldorson - pedal steel guitar on "Take It Off My Shoulders" and "Lie Down"
Jack Richardson - producer
Brian Christian - engineer

Charts
Album

Singles

References

1973 albums
The Guess Who albums
Albums produced by Jack Richardson (record producer)
RCA Records albums